The Odisha Women's Rugby Sevens Team represents Odisha in rugby sevens. The Odisha Rugby Football Association (ORFA), in association with India Rugby Football Union is the governing body for Odisha Women's Rugby Sevens Team.  Odisha women's rugby sevens team is currently the best rugby football team in India as they have as they have won the last five national championships.

Stadium

The Odisha Rugby Football Association (ORFA) has various bases across the state of Odisha; two of the main bases are Kalinga Stadium and KIIT Stadium in Bhubaneswar.

Kit
Odisha women's team have worn yellow and black for all of their Rugby Sevens games at national level. At present, the shirt's body is of yellow color, the sleeves are white and the socks and shorts are both black.

Squad
Odisha's 12 Member Squad for the 2018 Senior National Rugby Sevens Championship

Laxmipriya Sahu
Meerarani Hembram
Hupi Majhi (Captain)
Jemamani Naik
Manjulata Pradhan
Saraswati Hansdah
Parbati Kisku
Rajani Sabar
Poonam Singh
Sumitra Nayak
Bhagyalaxmi Barik
Lija Sardar

Administration
The following is the current organisational structure of Odisha Rugby Football Association (ORFA):

Honours
 Senior National Rugby Sevens Championship
Winners (5): 2014, 2015, 2016, 2017, 2018
Runners-Up (1): 2019

References

External links 
 The Official Website of Rugby India

Rugby union in India
Indian rugby union teams